Chukker may refer to:

a period in polo-type team sports, also spelled chukka
a family name, as the real name of actress Emma Caulfield